Sheikh Anne Rahman (28 September 1960 – 11 October 2022) was a Bangladesh Awami League politician who was a Jatiya Sangsad member for the reserved women's seat-19. She was related to Sheikh Hasina, the current Prime Minister of Bangladesh.

Career
Rahman was selected to parliament from Pirojpur reserved seat as a Bangladesh Awami League candidate February 16, 2019.

Personal life
Rahman was married to Sheikh Hafizur Rahman, cousin of Sheikh Mujibur Rahman, the first President of Bangladesh. Her father, Enayet Hossain Khan, was an Awami League politician and the former Jatiya Sangsad member of Bakerganj-16 (now defunct).

References

1960 births
2022 deaths
People from Pirojpur District
Sheikh Mujibur Rahman family
Awami League politicians
21st-century Bangladeshi women politicians
11th Jatiya Sangsad members
Women members of the Jatiya Sangsad